The 1940 Idaho Vandals football team represented the University of Idaho in the 1940 college football season. The Vandals were led by sixth-year head coach Ted Bank, and were members of the Pacific Coast Conference. Home games were played on campus in Moscow at Neale Stadium, with one game in Boise at Public School Field.

The Vandals were  overall and lost all four conference games. They did not play any of the four teams from California or the Oregon Webfoots. In the Battle of the Palouse with neighbor Washington State, the Vandals suffered a thirteenth straight loss, falling  at homecoming in Moscow on  Idaho's most recent win in the series was a fifteen years earlier in 1925 and the next was fourteen years away in 1954.

A week later, Idaho continued its rare three-year losing streak to Montana in the Little Brown Stein rivalry with a ten-point loss at Missoula. While Montana was in the PCC (through 1949), the loser of the game was frequently last in the conference standings. This was the seventh game of the season, and the first in which Idaho scored.

Bank was relieved of his coaching duties in January 1941, succeeded by Francis Schmidt of Ohio State.

Schedule

 One game was played on Thursday (at Utah in Salt Lake City on Thanksgiving)

All-conference
No Vandals were named to the All-Coast team; honorable mention were end Chace Anderson, tackle Glenn Rathbun, and guard Len Zenkevitch.

References

External links
Gem of the Mountains: 1941 University of Idaho yearbook – 1940 football season
Go Mighty Vandals – 1940 football season
Idaho Argonaut – student newspaper – 1940 editions

Idaho
Idaho Vandals football seasons
Idaho Vandals football